Elizabeth Perry may refer to:

Elizabeth J. Perry (born 1948), American scholar of Chinese politics and history
Liz Cheney also known as Elizabeth Cheney Perry American attorney and political commentator
Elizabeth Perry (actress), actress in The Brain of Colonel Barham
Liz Perry (born 1987), New Zealand cricketer